The Iraq–Kuwait border is 254 km (158 mi) in length and runs from the tripoint with Saudi Arabia in the west to the Persian Gulf coast in the east.

Description
The border starts in the west at the Saudi tripoint on the Wadi al-Batin, and then follows this wadi as it flows north-eastwards. The border then turns east, following a straight line for 32 km (20 mi), before another straight line veers to the south-east for 26 km (16 mi), terminating at the coast by the junction of the Khawr Abd Allah and Khor as Subiyah opposite Hajjam Island.

History
Historically there was no clearly defined boundary in this part of the Arabian peninsula; at the start of the 20th century the Ottoman Empire controlled what is now Iraq and Britain controlled Kuwait as a protectorate. Britain and the Ottoman Empire theoretically divided their realms of influence via the so-called 'Blue' and 'Violet lines' in 1913–14, by which the Ottomans recognised British claims on Kuwait, divided from Ottoman Mesopotamia along the Wadi al-Batin (the so-called 'green line', see map right).

During the First World War an Arab Revolt, supported by Britain, succeeded in removing the Ottomans from most of the Middle East. As a result of the secret 1916 Anglo-French Sykes-Picot Agreement Britain gained control of the Ottoman Vilayets of Mosul, Baghdad and Basra, which it organised into the mandate of Iraq in 1920. In 1932, the year that Iraq gained independence, Britain confirmed that the border between Iraq and Kuwait would run along the Wadi al-Batin, as well as confirming that Bubiyan and Warbah islands were Kuwaiti territoriality, though the precise positioning of the northern straight line segments near Safwan remained imprecise.

Kuwait gained independence in 1961, though Iraq initially refused to recognise the country claiming it as part of Iraq, later backing down following a show of force by Britain and the Arab League in support of Kuwait. A treaty of friendship was signed in 1963 by which Iraq recognised the 1932 border. Despite this, over the ensuing decade Iraq often raised the issue of sea access and the traditional claim to Kuwait, most notably in 1973 with the 1973 Samita border skirmish.

In 1990 Iraq invaded and annexed Kuwait, precipitating the Gulf War by which Kuwait's sovereignty was restored. In July 1992 the matter of border demarcation was referred to the United Nations, which accurately mapped the boundary and then demarcated it on the ground, following the 1932 line with some small adjustments. The border initially was accepted by Kuwait but not Iraq. Iraq accepted the border in November 1994. The United Nations Iraq–Kuwait Observation Mission monitored the border during the period 1991–2003. Relations between the two states have improved since the fall of Saddam Hussein in 2003.

In February 2023, Kuwait's foreign minister Sheikh Salem Abdullah Al-Jaber Al-Sabah said Iraq and Kuwait would hold talks aimed at resolving the maritime border dispute between the two countries.

Barrier
The Iraq–Kuwait barrier ( Hudud al-'Irāq-al-Kuwayt) is a  border fence extending  into Iraq,  into Kuwait, and across the full length of their mutual border from Saudi Arabia to the Persian Gulf. Constructed by authorisation of the United Nations Security Council, its stated purpose was to stop a re-invasion of Kuwait by Iraq, although a fence would be quite useless against tanks and planes.

Construction of the barrier began in 1991.

In January 2004, Kuwait decided to install a new  iron barrier along the border. The barrier was estimated to have cost $28 million and the entire length of the border; asphalted roads were be also constructed to facilitate border security movement.

Settlements near the border

Iraq
 Safwan
 Umm Qasr

Kuwait
 Abdali

See also
 Iraq-Kuwait relations

References

 
International borders
History of Kuwait